This page is a list of various individuals who are multiple Olympic medalists at the Winter Olympics.

List of multiple Winter Olympic medalists
This list shows only the athletes who have won at least eight medals at the Winter Olympics.

Most medals in one individual event
This list shows only the athletes who have won at least four medals in the same individual event at the Winter Olympics.

 Figure skating was a Summer Olympic sport in 1920. It became a Winter Olympic sport in 1924, when the first Winter Olympic Games were held.

See also
 List of multiple Summer Olympic medalists
 List of multiple Olympic medalists
 List of multiple Olympic medalists at a single Games
 List of multiple Olympic medalists in one event
 List of athletes with the most appearances at Olympic Games
 List of Olympians who won medals in the Summer and Winter Games

External links
 Record and Medals at the Olympic Winter Games
 Athlete Medal Leaders from Sports Reference

Olympic Games medal tables